Myriam Lignot (born 9 July 1975 in Laon, Aisne) is a French synchronized swimmer and Olympic medalist. She won a bronze medal at the 2000 Summer Olympics in Sydney, in duet together with Virginie Dedieu, and placed fourth in the team competition.

Lignot retired after the Sydney 2000 Games at the age of 23. Few years later, she became coach of Pays d'Aix Natation synchronized swimming club.

Career records
Duet
1994 World Aquatics Championships, Rome, 4th (with Marianne Aeschbacher)
1995 European Aquatics Championships, Vienna, 2nd (with Marianne Aeschbacher)
1997 European Aquatics Championships, Sevilla, 2nd (with Virginie Dedieu)
1999 European Aquatics Championships, Istanbul, 2nd (with Virginie Dedieu)
2000 European Aquatics Championships, Helsinki, 2nd (with Virginie Dedieu)
2000 Summer Olympics, Sydney, 3rd (with Virginie Dedieu)

Team
1996 Summer Olympics, Atlanta, 5th
2000 European Aquatics Championships, Helsinki, 3rd
2000 Summer Olympics, Sydney, 4th

References

1975 births
Living people
French synchronized swimmers
Olympic bronze medalists for France
Olympic synchronized swimmers of France
Synchronized swimmers at the 1996 Summer Olympics
Synchronized swimmers at the 2000 Summer Olympics
Olympic medalists in synchronized swimming
Medalists at the 2000 Summer Olympics